Weller Township is one of twenty-four townships in Henry County, Illinois, USA.  As of the 2010 census, its population was 422 and it contained 197 housing units.

Geography

Cities, towns, villages
 Bishop Hill

Unincorporated towns
 Nekoma at 
(This list is based on USGS data and may include former settlements.)

Adjacent townships
 Cambridge Township (north)
 Galva Township (east)
 Lynn Township, Knox County (southeast)
 Walnut Grove Township, Knox County (south)
 Ontario Township, Knox County (southwest)
 Clover Township (west)
 Andover Township (northwest)

Cemeteries
The township contains these three cemeteries: Bishop Hill, Piatt and Red Oak.

Major highways
  U.S. Route 34
  Illinois Route 17
  Illinois Route 82

Demographics

School districts
 Alwood Community Unit School District 225
 Cambridge Community Unit School District 227
 Galva Community Unit School District 224
 R O W V A Community Unit School District 208

Political districts
 Illinois's 17th congressional district
 State House District 74
 State Senate District 37

References
 United States Census Bureau 2008 TIGER/Line Shapefiles
 
 United States National Atlas

External links
 City-Data.com
 Illinois State Archives
 Township Officials of Illinois

Townships in Henry County, Illinois
Townships in Illinois